DJ: Duvvada Jagannadham is a 2017 Indian Telugu-language action comedy film written-directed by Harish Shankar. Produced by Dil Raju, the film stars Allu Arjun and Pooja Hegde. Devi Sri Prasad composed the music.

Duvvada Jagannadham was released on 23 June 2017. The film received positive response. The film became one of the highest-grossing Telugu films of 2017, collecting over 150 crore.

Plot 
Duvvada Jagannadham Sastri is a cook working as a caterer from Vijayawada along with his Brahmin family. He also masquerades as DJ, a stylish and altruistic vigilante, who kills wrongdoers with the help of his mentor CI Puroshottam. At his friend Vignesh's wedding, he meets Pooja and falls for her independent nature. 

Royyala Naidu is an actor and a builder, who also runs two fraud company called Agro Diamond and Naidu Constructions. Naidu appointed his secretary, Stephen Prakash to be the chairman of Agro Diamond, but Sameer Chandra, the CEO of Agro Diamond, learns that Stephen has transferred the money elsewhere and files a case against the company. After the wedding, Jagannadham finds out that his uncle had committed suicide and reads the suicide note which explains that his uncle booked an 1800-sq foot flat from Agro Diamond by spending all his savings but when he went to pay his final installment, he found that the company is bogus. Due to depression and the beratement from his own daughter, he committed suicide. 

Jagannadham finds out from Purushottam about the scam of 900 crore ($138 million) orchestrated by Stephen. When Sameer, who agrees to become the witness in the court is about to get killed by hitmen hired by Stephen, DJ defeats Stephen and tells him at gunpoint to call his hitmen to abort the mission. Pooja's father who is the State Home Minister Pushpam, and also involved with Royyala Naidu in his crimes gets a marriage proposal from Naidu's son Avinash. When she meets Avinash at Abu Dhabi, she starts disliking him for his behaviour and learns that he suffers from Schizophrenia. Pooja realizes Jagannadham's love when she returns to India and confesses her love for Jagannadham to her father, who disapproves citing his status issues in society. 

Pushpam and Naidu plan to kill Jagannadham. Naidu hires Stephen to do the job. Stephen lures Jagannadham with the help of his henchman, but Jagannadham overpowers them and kidnaps Stephen. DJ challenges Naidu that he'd find him and make him pay for his crimes; Naidu, who doesn't know about DJ hires an officer to find out about DJ. Jagannadham forcefully tries to interrogate Stephen about his allies but in vain. Pooja eventually arrives in Vijayawada to confess her love to Jagannadham and sends photos of her and Jagannadham to her father. He shows it to Naidu who gets shocked (Naidu was hiding in the car when Stephen was threatened at gunpoint by DJ). Naidu tells Pushpam to act like he agreed to the proposal. Naidu dresses up as one of the bodyguards of Pushpam where Pooja and Jagannadham's families meet each other, and Naidu finally recognizes that Jagannadham is DJ. 

The next day, Jagannadham's sister and Vignesh get attacked by Naidu's henchman where they're interrogated about the whereabouts of Stephen, and Jagannadham's family are also troubled by them. Jagannadham finally decides with Purushottam that he will put an end to Royyala Naidu. Jagannadham sends his family on a pilgrimage to keep them safe. Naidu's henchmen break into the house and ask Jagannadham whereabouts of Stephen. They beat him up when Jagannadham asks about their boss. When he's about to get killed, Jagannadham asks Naidu's henchman to remove the holy rudraksha (which is a penance to his father to not be involved in violence). When the rudraksha is removed, DJ kills all the goons who then reveal that Naidu is their boss. Jagannadham calls Pooja and reveals himself as DJ and asks her for information about Naidu's son Avinash. 

Jagannadham goes to Abu Dhabi and uses Avinash with his mental disability to find out where Royyala Naidu is. Naidu kidnaps Purushottam. Avinash arrives at the hideout and beats up Jagannadham for cheating him. Jagannadham shows them the money and turns Avinash against his father. Jagannadham, with the help of Avinash's mental disability, shoots Naidu dead. Stephen Prakash announces to the scam victims to provide them with their houses and their lost income, but Avinash is taken away for police interrogation.

Cast

Production

Development 
After the success of Sarrainodu (2016), Allu Arjun announced that he will be collaborating for a Tamil-Telugu bilingual directed by N. Linguswamy, which was expected to go on floors. Meanwhile in June 2016, he announced that his next film will be directed by Harish Shankar, and produced by Dil Raju. The film marks the second collaboration of Raju, with Arjun after Arya (2004) and Parugu (2008). While the makers are yet to finalise the cast and crew members, Devi Sri Prasad announced that he will compose music for the film. Shruti Haasan and Kajal Aggarwal were approached to play the lead actress but Pooja Hegde was eventually finalized for that role. Rao Ramesh is signed to play Royyalu Naidu, which is based on the character played by Ramesh's father Rao Gopal Rao in Aa Okkati Adakku (1992).

On 28 August 2016, the film makers announced the title of the film as Duvvada Jagannatham. The film was launched on 29 August 2016, at the office of the production house in Hyderabad.

Filming 
Principal photography of the film was supposed to commence on 21 October 2016. However, the first leg of the shoot began on 4 November 2016. The filming briefly delayed after Arjun took a break, to spend some quality time with his wife Sneha Reddy, who is expecting her second child. The shooting was later resumed in January 2017.

The production crew also chose Abu Dhabi as a filming location, as they would benefit from the Emirate's 30% film production rebate. The film was shot across Abu Dhabi Global Market, Abu Dhabi National Exhibition Centre, Intercontinental Hotel, Yas Links Golf Club and Galleria Mall.

The film team placed a statue of Lord Shiva in Chennakeshava Temple in Belur, which was found against the custom and tradition of the temple and was opposed by the temple priests, which led to stall the shoot. The makers planned to shift the shoot to Mysore, until the film team obtained permission from the Department of History and Archaeology for the shoot and resumed it. The film completed the shooting of major action episodes at the aluminum factory in Hyderabad on 21 April 2017. On 15 May 2017, it was announced that the principal shoot of the film got wrapped.

Soundtrack 

The film's music is composed by Devi Sri Prasad, who is collaborating with Harish Shankar for the second time and with Allu Arjun for the seventh time. The album consists of five tracks with Jonnavittula Ramalingeswara Rao, Sri Mani, Bhaskarabhatla, Sahithi and Balaji penning the lyrics.

On 3 May 2017, the first single of the film "DJ Saranam Bhaje Bhaje" was released through the YouTube channel of Aditya Music, the music label which bought the film's audio rights. The promo of the song "Gudilo Badilo Madilo Vodilo" was unveiled on 15 May, and two days later, on 17 May 2017, the full song was released and got wide reception. The film's audio was released on 21 May 2017, at Shilpakala Vedika in Hyderabad.

The song "Seeti Maar" was later re-mixed in Salman Khan's film Radhe.

Release 
The film's release was originally scheduled for 19 May 2017, but it was postponed to 30 June 2017, due to the delay in the film's production. In April 2017, a new release date was scheduled as 23 June 2017, coinciding with the Ramzan weekend. The film's dubbed versions were released in Malayalam, Tamil, Hindi and Bengali.

Reception 
Duvvada Jagannadham film received positive response.

Sangeetha Devi Dundoo of The Hindu stated "The film could have been much more gripping but for being punctuated with a handful of songs, quite a few high-decibel ones at that. At 156 minutes, DJ is bloated and loses its tempo now and then. While some of the dialogues are fun, others make you cringe." She compared the film with S. Shankar directorial Gentleman (1993 film) where a Brahmin protagonist moonlights as a thief, steals from the rich and gives to the poor.

Srivatsan of India Today wrote that "We get the fact that the masala is very important for this genre. But the scenes that are supposed to leave you misty-eyed end up as comic relief. Jokes fall flat and the mass action blocks are not enough. At the same time, it's impossible to write off Allu Arjun. He's effective in bits; especially when the director wants him to dance and send goons into the air. Someone said that Allu Arjun's body is made of rubber and there can't be a better description. The problem with Duvvada Jagannadham is its half-baked story, which is everything we've seen in Allu Arjun's films earlier. To keep up with DJ's style, Duvvada Jagannadham is "Boring-ah, bore-asya, bore-obiah".

Sowmya Sruthi of The Times of India rated the film 3 out of 5 stars. Manoj Kumar R of The Indian Express rated the film 2.5 out of 5 stars and wrote "It is a commercial entertainer made by the book and it works to some extent". Hemanth Kumar of Firstpost gave 2.5 stars rating out of 5 and wrote that "The point is when you try making a new recipe, it’s not merely enough to have all the right ingredients. You’ve to know when to switch off the flame. In the end, when you think about this DJ, it just gets loud, louder, loudest. Thumbs down. But hey, Allu Arjun still dances like a dream!"

Accolades

Notes

References

External links 
 

2017 films
2010s Telugu-language films
Films directed by Harish Shankar
Films scored by Devi Sri Prasad
Films shot in Karnataka
Films about corruption in India
Films shot in Hyderabad, India
Films shot in Abu Dhabi
Films shot in the United Arab Emirates
2010s vigilante films
Indian vigilante films
Indian action comedy films
2017 action comedy films
Films shot in Vijayawada
Films set in Vijayawada
2017 comedy films
Sri Venkateswara Creations films